Elizabeth Gibney is a senior physics reporter at Nature. She has written for Scientific American, BBC and CERN.

Education 
Gibney studied the Natural Sciences Tripos at the University of Cambridge. She completed an Master of Science (MSc) degree in Science Communication at Imperial College London.

Career 
Gibney worked for Research Fortnight. Gibney worked in the communications team for the CMS experiment at CERN. She has been described as "feminist science journalist". She worked at Times Higher Education between 2012 and 2013. She dubbed the excitement surrounding particle physics after detection of the Higgs boson as Higgsteria.

Gibney joined Nature in 2013 and is now senior physics reporter. Gibney produces 3-minute guides to new areas of research. In 2014, she won the Malofiej Medal for her infographics Landing on a comet. in 2015, she was highly commended at the Science Journalism Awards for her short video "Laniakea: Our home supercluster".

She has written for Scientific American, The Sunday Times, BBC News and the Department for Environment, Food and Rural Affairs (DEFRA).

References

Living people
Alumni of the University of Cambridge
Alumni of Imperial College London
British science journalists
English women journalists
Women science writers
Year of birth missing (living people)
People associated with CERN